Bulloch County Correctional Institution is located in Statesboro, Georgia in Bulloch County, Georgia. The facility houses Adult Male Felons with a capacity of 132. It was constructed in 1942 and opened in 1945. It was renovated in 1989. It is a Medium security prison.

References
Georgia Department of Correction

Buildings and structures in Bulloch County, Georgia
Prisons in Georgia (U.S. state)
Buildings and structures completed in 1942
1945 establishments in Georgia (U.S. state)